Richard Palmer Blackmur (January 21, 1904 – February 2, 1965) was an American literary critic and poet.

Life
Blackmur was born and grew up in Springfield, Massachusetts.  
He attended Cambridge High and Latin School, but was expelled in 1918.
An autodidact, Blackmur worked in a bookshop after high school, and attended lectures at Harvard University without enrolling. He was managing editor of the literary quarterly Hound & Horn from 1928 to 1930, at which time he resigned, although he continued to contribute to the magazine until its demise in 1934.

In 1930 he married Helen Dickson.
In 1935 he published his first volume of criticism, The Double Agent; during the 1930s his criticism was influential among many modernist poets and the New Critics.

In 1940 Blackmur moved to Princeton University, where he taught first creative writing and then English literature for the next twenty-five years.  In 1947, he was awarded a Rockefeller Fellowship.

He founded and directed the university's Christian Gauss Seminars in Criticism, named in honor of his colleague Christian Gauss. He met other influential poets while he taught at Princeton. They include W. S. Merwin and John Berryman. Merwin later published an anthology dedicated to Blackmur and Berryman, and a book of his own poetry (The Moving Target) dedicated to Blackmur. 
He taught at Cambridge University in 1961—62.

Blackmur died in Princeton, New Jersey and was buried at the Pittsfield Cemetery in Pittsfield, Massachusetts.

His papers are held at Princeton University.

In popular culture
Frederick Crews parodied Blackmur as "P. R. Honeycomb" in his 1963 book of satirical literary criticism The Pooh Perplex.

Saul Bellow based the snob figure of the critic Sewell on him in the novel Humboldt's Gift (1975).

Works
Poetry
From Jordan's Delight 1937
The Second World, 1942
The Good European, 1947
Poems of R. P. Blackmur, Princeton University Press, 1977

Criticism
The Double Agent: essays in craft and elucidation, 1935
The Expense of Greatness, 1940
Language as Gesture, 1952
Form and value in modern poetry, Doubleday, 1952
The Lion and the Honeycomb, 1955
Eleven Essays in the European Novel, 1964

Denis Donoghue, ed. Selected essays of R.P. Blackmur, Ecco Press, 1986,

Notes

Attribution

Robert Boyers, R. P. Blackmur, poet-critic: toward a view of poetic objects, University of Missouri Press, 1980,

External links

 Finding aid to R.P. Blackmur papers and manuscripts at Columbia University. Rare Book & Manuscript Library.
Blackmur from The Johns Hopkins Guide to Literary Theory and Criticism
 Blackmur from A Princeton Companion by Alexander Leitch (1978)
 "No Success Like Failure", a discussion of Blackmur's career from the New York Review of Books (abstract online; full text for subscribers only)
Bloom, James D. The Stock of Available Reality: R.P. Blackmur and John Berryman. (Bucknell University Press, 1984)
 
"Why R. P. Blackmur Found James's Golden Bowl Inhumane", ELH, Volume 68, Number 3, Fall 2001, pp. 725–743
"A Critic's Obscurity: R. P. Blackmur", Maurice Kramer, College English, Vol. 22, No. 8 (May, 1961), pp. 553–555
"R. P. Blackmur: The Politics of a New Critic", Russell Fraser, The Sewanee Review, Vol. 87, No. 4 (Fall, 1979), pp. 557–572
"No Success Like Failure", Michael Wood, The New York Review of Books, May 7, 1987

1904 births
1965 deaths
American literary critics
School of Letters faculty
Princeton University faculty
Writers from Springfield, Massachusetts
Academics of the University of Cambridge
20th-century American non-fiction writers
Cambridge Rindge and Latin School alumni
Members of the American Academy of Arts and Letters